Keith Davis (born 5 December 1935) was an English cricketer. He was a left-handed batsman and right-arm slow-medium bowler who played for Cornwall. He was born in St Germans.

Davis made a single List A appearance for the side, during the 1970 season, against Glamorgan. From the middle order, he scored 4 runs.

Davis bowled twelve overs in the match, taking figures of 2-30.

External links
Keith Davis at Cricket Archive

1935 births
Living people
English cricketers
Cornwall cricketers
People from St Germans, Cornwall